The name Utor was used for three tropical cyclones in the Philippines by PAGASA in the Western Pacific Ocean. The name was contributed by the United States and is a Marshallese word for squall line.

 Tropical Storm Utor (2001) (T0104, 06W, Feria) – made landfall on the Dapeng Peninsula, China.
 Typhoon Utor (2006) (T0622, 25W, Seniang) – struck the Philippines.
 Typhoon Utor (2013) (T1311, 11W, Labuyo) – powerful typhoon that made landfall on Luzon, in the Philippines, and later in Guangdong, China.

The name Utor was retired after the 2013 typhoon season and replaced with Barijat. The name was contributed by the United States of America, and is the Marshallese word for coastal areas impacted by waves/winds.

Pacific typhoon set index articles